The 1994 World Artistic Gymnastics Team Championships were held in Dortmund, Germany, from 15 to 20 November 1994.

Only the team event was contested at this meet. The individual events and all-around were contested at another World Championships in Brisbane, Australia in April 1994. This was the only year in which the World Championships were split into two separate competitions.

Participants

Men

Women

Medalists

Men's results

Women's results

References 

World Artistic Gymnastics Championships
G
G
International gymnastics competitions hosted by Germany
1994 in gymnastics
November 1994 sports events in Europe
1990s in North Rhine-Westphalia
20th century in Dortmund